

This is a list of the National Register of Historic Places listings in northern Westchester County, New York, excluding the city of Peekskill, which has its own list.

This is intended to be a complete list of the properties and districts on the National Register of Historic Places in the northern half of Westchester County, New York, United States. The following communities comprise this region:

Bedford (including Bedford Corners, Bedford Hills etc.)
Cortlandt (including the villages of Buchanan, Croton-on-Hudson, and Montrose).
Lewisboro, including the hamlets of Cross River, Goldens Bridge, South Salem and Waccabuc.
Mount Kisco
Mount Pleasant (including the villages of Briarcliff Manor, Pleasantville, Sleepy Hollow and the hamlets of Hawthorne, Pocantico Hills and Thornwood).
New Castle, including the hamlets of Chappaqua and Millwood
North Castle, including the hamlet of Armonk
North Salem, including the hamlets of Croton Falls and Purdys
Ossining, including the eponymous village
Pound Ridge
Somers, including the hamlets of Amawalk, Baldwin Place (Westchester portion), Lincolndale and Whitehall Corners
The village of Tarrytown
Yorktown, including the hamlets of Jefferson Valley, Mohegan Lake, Shrub Oak and Yorktown Heights.

Entries for the city of Peekskill are listed separately.

Latitude and longitude coordinates are provided for many National Register properties and districts; these locations may be seen together in a map.

Of the 242 properties and districts listed on the National Register in the county, 99, including 12 National Historic Landmarks (NHLs), are on this list. Two, the Bronx River Parkway and Old Croton Aqueduct, the latter an NHL, are linear listings included on both this list and the southern Westchester list.

Current listings

|}

Former listing

|}

See also
National Register of Historic Places listings in New York
National Register of Historic Places listings in Westchester County, New York

References

Further reading